Errol Ashton Clairmore Hunte (October 3, 1905, Port of Spain, Trinidad – June 26, 1967, Port of Spain, Trinidad) was a West Indian cricketer who played in three Tests in 1930.

References

1905 births
1967 deaths
West Indies Test cricketers
Cricketers from Port of Spain
Trinidad and Tobago cricketers
Wicket-keepers